David Horst (born October 25, 1985) is a former American soccer player who last played for Real Salt Lake in Major League Soccer.

Career

College and amateur
Horst played college soccer at Old Dominion University, and in the USL Premier Development League with Reading Rage, Virginia Beach Submariners and the Hampton Roads Piranhas. He was 2007 PDL Defensive Player of the Year.

Horst played four years at Old Dominion University, leading the Monarchs to back-to-back Sweet 16 appearances in the NCAA Men's College Cup. He was named the CAA Defender of the Year in back-to-back seasons, in 2006 and 2007. Horst was recipient of the Norfolk Sports Club's Tom Scott award as ODU's top senior student athlete. In 2007, Horst was named second team All-American by College Soccer News, and was also named NSCAA First team All-Region in 2006 and 2007.

Professional
Horst was drafted in the first round (14th overall) of the 2008 MLS SuperDraft by Real Salt Lake. He made his full professional debut for RSL on 16 August 2008 against the Houston Dynamo. Horst also spent time with USL-1 club Austin Aztex during the 2009 season.

During April 2010 Horst was sent out on loan to the Puerto Rico Islanders of the USSF Division 2 Professional League. He was sent off on his Islanders debut, on May 26, 2010 in a game against the Carolina RailHawks. On September 30, 2010, the Islanders where down 0–2 on halftime in a CONCACAF Champions League group stage match against Toluca from Mexico, teammate David Foley scored the first goal for the Islanders to make 2–1 in the second half, later, Horst scored the equalizer and the game winner in extra time. On October 2, 2010, Horst scored his first league goal against Miami FC. The Puerto Rico Islanders won the USSF Division 2 Professional League Championship on October 30, 2010 against the Carolina Railhawks.

On November 24, 2010, Horst was selected by Portland Timbers in the 2010 MLS Expansion Draft. Horst impressed during the Timbers' inaugural 2011 season and signed a new contract with the club on November 28, 2011.

On December 17, 2013, Horst was dealt to the Houston Dynamo in exchange for a 4th-round pick in the 2014 MLS SuperDraft.  Due to an ankle injury to former Portland teammate Eric Brunner, Horst became a starter for Houston.

In January 2017, Horst resigned with Real Salt Lake as a free agent. Horst suffered a fully ruptured right Achilles tendon in late June 2018 that kept him sidelined for the remainder of the season. On December 5, 2018, Horst retired from professional soccer, with his contract option for the next season declined by the team due to circumstances around his age and injury history.

Honors

Puerto Rico Islanders
USSF Division 2 Pro League Champions (1): 2010

References

External links

 

1985 births
Living people
American soccer players
Old Dominion Monarchs men's soccer players
Reading United A.C. players
Virginia Beach Piranhas players
Real Salt Lake players
Austin Aztex FC players
Puerto Rico Islanders players
Portland Timbers players
Houston Dynamo FC players
Real Monarchs players
Soccer players from Pennsylvania
Real Salt Lake draft picks
USL League Two players
Major League Soccer players
People from Hershey, Pennsylvania
USL First Division players
USSF Division 2 Professional League players
USL Championship players
Expatriate footballers in Puerto Rico
Association football defenders